Kerry Flint (born 17 September 1946) is an Australian former cricketer. He played one first-class match for Tasmania in 1965/66.

See also
 List of Tasmanian representative cricketers

References

External links
 

1946 births
Living people
Australian cricketers
Tasmania cricketers
Cricketers from Tasmania